Reed mat may refer to:

Reed mat (craft), handmade mats produced in Thailand and India
Reed mat (plastering), a base for plastering internal walls